The Roman Catholic Diocese of Beihai/Pakhoi is a diocese located in the city of Beihai (Guangxi) in the Ecclesiastical province of Guangzhou in China.

History
 August 1, 1920: Established as Apostolic Vicariate of Western Guangdong and Hainan 粵西海南 from the Apostolic Vicariate of Guangzhou 廣州
 December 3, 1924: Renamed as Apostolic Vicariate of Beihai 北海
 April 11, 1946: Promoted as Diocese of Beihai 北海

Leadership
 Bishops of Beihai 北海 (Roman rite)
 Bishop Paul Su Yong-da (2004–present)
 Bishop Gustave-Joseph Deswazières, M.E.P. (祝福) (April 11, 1946 – February 22, 1959)
 Vicars Apostolic of Beihai 北海 (Roman Rite)
 Bishop Gustave-Joseph Deswazières, M.E.P. (祝福) (November 27, 1940 – April 11, 1946)
 Bishop Jean-Baptiste-Michel-Marie-Louis Pénicaud, M.E.P. (贲德馨) (December 16, 1929 – February 1940)
 Bishop Gustave-Joseph Deswazières, M.E.P. (祝福) (February 15, 1928 – November 1928)
 Bishop Auguste Gauthier, M.E.P. (俄永垂) (December 3, 1924 – May 12, 1927)
 Vicars Apostolic of Western Guangdong and Hainan 粵西海南 (Roman Rite)
 Bishop Auguste Gauthier, M.E.P. (俄永垂) (June 1, 1921 – December 3, 1924)

References

 GCatholic.org
 Catholic Hierarchy

Roman Catholic dioceses in China
Christian organizations established in 1920
Roman Catholic dioceses and prelatures established in the 20th century
Religion in Guangxi
Beihai